Ha Dabateer (born 27 April 1977) is a Chinese boxer. He competed in the men's middleweight event at the 2004 Summer Olympics.

References

External links
 

1977 births
Living people
People from Chifeng
People from Inner Mongolia
Sportspeople from Inner Mongolia
Chinese male boxers
Olympic boxers of China
Boxers at the 2004 Summer Olympics
Place of birth missing (living people)
Boxers at the 2002 Asian Games
Asian Games competitors for China
Middleweight boxers
21st-century Chinese people